The South Pacific Tuna Treaty is a fisheries treaty agreement between the United States and 16 Pacific Island countries. The treaty entered into force in 1988, was extended in 1993, and again in 2002, and runs to 2022, unless otherwise extended. It allows for United States fishing vessels to fish in the exclusive economic zones of the other party states.

The parties to the treaty are:
Australia
Cook Islands
Federated States of Micronesia
Fiji
Kiribati
Marshall Islands
Nauru
New Zealand
Niue
Palau
Papua New Guinea
Samoa
Solomon Islands
Tonga
Tuvalu
United States
Vanuatu

The area covered by the treaty contains the largest and most valuable tuna fisheries in the world, on which many Pacific Island countries depend as one of their most important natural resources.

See also
Pacific Islands Forum Fisheries Agency

References

External links
Treaty text

Treaties entered into force in 1988
Fisheries treaties